Alfred Brain may refer to:

 Alfred Edwin Brain Sr. (1860–1929), English player of the French horn
 Alfred Edwin Brain Jr. (1885–1966), English player of the French horn